Acontista inquinata is a species of mantid in the family Acontistidae.

References

Mantodea
Articles created by Qbugbot
Insects described in 1894